Aaron Moses Fogel (born 1947 New York City) is an American poet.

Life
He was raised in New York City.
He graduated from Columbia University, Cambridge University, and Columbia University, with a Ph.D.

Fogel has been on the faculty at Boston University since 1978.

His work has appeared in AGNI, American Poet, Boulevard, Matrix, No, Pequod, The Stud Duck.

Awards
2001 Kahn Award for 'The Printer's Error 
 1987-88 Guggenheim Fellow
 1967-69 Kellett Fellowship

Works
"People", poets.org
"Shore Container", poets.org
"The Goat", poets.org
"The Man Who Never Heard of Frank Sinatra", poets.org
"The Riddle of Flat Circles [excerpt]", poets.org
"Cobblestones", Octopus

Criticism

Anthologies

Reviews
A couple of years ago--would it have been 1995 or ‘96?--carelessly flipping through The Best American Poetry, 1995 (an anthology that, to its editor, Richard Howard’s credit, was full of poets a lot of people hadn't heard of) I was stopped dead in my tracks by a truly wondrous poem: "The Printer’s Error" by Aaron Fogel. It was deceptively simple, direct, moving and thoroughly astounding, full of political, religious and cultural truth. Who (I asked myself and everyone else who might conceivably know) was this Aaron Fogel?

References

1947 births
Living people
American male poets
Columbia College (New York) alumni
Boston University faculty
Academics of the University of Cambridge
20th-century American poets
20th-century American male writers